The Peace River Formation is a Late Oligocene to Early Miocene geologic formation in the west-central Florida peninsula.

Age
Period: Neogene
Epoch: Miocene to Pliocene
Faunal stage: Arikareean through Hemphillian, ~23.03–4.9 mya, calculates to a period of ~

Location
The Peace River Formation appears as an outcropping or is beneath a thin overburden from Hillsborough County to Charlotte County on the southern part of the Ocala Platform. extending into the Okeechobee Basin. It is widespread in Florida and part of the intermediate confining aquifer system.

Lithology
The formation is composed of sands, clays and carbonates which are interbedded. The sands are light gray to olive gray and poorly consolidated. They are clay-like with some dolomite with a very fine to medium grained phosphate component. Carbonates are usually light gray to yellowish dolomite found in outcroppings. The dolomites are soft to hard with variably sandy, clay-like, phosphate components with opaline chert often found. The phosphate content is high enough to warrant mining.

Three sequences of sediment deposition were defined in 1998. Five lithofacies were identified in 2000 (upper part of the formation).
Diatomaceous mudstone
Terrigenous mudstone
Clay-rich quartz sand
Quartz sand
Pelecypod-rich quartz sand or sandstone

Fossils
Mollusks occur as reworked casts, molds, and limited original shell material.
Vertebrate fossils
Shark's teeth
Silicified corals and wood

Members
The Bone Valley Member is a subunit of the Peace River Formation (originally the Bone Valley Formation) and occurs in a limited area on the southern part of the Ocala Platform in Hillsborough, Polk County, and Hardee County. (Webb & Crissinger). It is consistently clastic with sand-sized grains and larger grains of phosphate in a mixture of quartz sand, silt and clay. The consolidation is poor and colors range from white, light brown and yellowish gray to olive gray and blue green.

See also

Polk County, Florida paleontological sites

References

Finch, J., Geological essay on the Tertiary formation in America: American Journal of Science, v. 7, p. 31–43, 1823.

Further reading
Berkenkotter, Richard D,  Application of statistical analysis in evaluating bedded deposits of variable thickness—Florida phosphate data (United States. Bureau of Mines. Report of investigations, U.S. Dept. of the Interior, Bureau of Mines (1964)

Neogene Florida
Miocene United States
Pliocene United States
Miocene Series of North America
Pliocene Series of North America
Geologic formations of Florida
Paleontological sites of Florida